Randy to the Rescue is an American reality television series that aired on the TLC cable network, starting June 15, 2012. Each episode of the series shows Randy Fenoli as he helps brides pick out the perfect wedding dress for their special day. The show was a spin-off of the highly popular Say Yes to the Dress franchise. The series concluded on August 2, 2013 when it was not renewed for a third season.

Cast

Randy Fenoli

Randy Fenoli is one of the directors for Kleinfeld Bridal in Manhattan, New York. He purchased the bridal salon in 1999 with personal friends, Mara Urshel and Wayne Rogers. In the series, Randy helps brides select dresses for their wedding day, regardless of their outrageous demands and requirements. In addition to fulfilling these, Randy travels nationwide to help the bride, instead of the bride traveling to New York.

Episodes

Season 1 (2012)

Season 2 (2013)

Reception
Upon premiere, the series received mixed reviews. On a positive note, Common Sense Media stated that Randy "gives brides a confidence boost." while SideReel awarded the series 3.8/5 stars. Unlike its predecessor, the series was cancelled after two seasons.

References

External links

Kleinfeld Bridal
 

2010s American reality television series
2012 American television series debuts
2013 American television series endings
American television spin-offs
Reality television spin-offs
English-language television shows
TLC (TV network) original programming